Michael Moussa Adamo (10 January 1961 – 20 January 2023) was a Gabonese politician and diplomat.

Career 
Moussa Adamo was born on 10 January 1961 in Makokou. He started out as a presenter on national television. In 2000, he was made chief of staff of defence minister Ali Bongo Ondimba. When Bongo was elected president in 2009, he served as Bongo's special adviser. Moussa Adamo served as Gabon's ambassador to the United States from 2011 to 2020. After, he served as defence minister before becoming foreign minister. He died on 20 January 2023 after a heart attack while waiting to go into a cabinet meeting.

References 

1961 births
2023 deaths
Foreign ministers of Gabon
Defence ministers of Gabon
Ambassadors of Gabon to the United States
People from Ogooué-Ivindo Province
21st-century diplomats
21st-century Gabonese politicians